Aruna Devi is an Indian politician from Bharatiya Janata Party, Bihar who is currently Member of Bihar Legislative Assembly representing Warisaliganj of Nawada district. She was elected as the Member of Bihar Legislative Assembly for the first time in 2000 as an Independent. She emerged victorious for the second time in February 2005 as Lok Janshakti Party candidate. She later joined Indian National Congress and contested as Congress candidate in October 2005 & 2010 but lost to Pradeep Mahto of Janata Dal (United). She later jumped ships to the Bharatiya Janata Party in 2015 and emerged victorious in 2015 as well as 2020.

References 

Living people
1976 births
Indian women in politics
Indian National Congress politicians from Bihar
Bharatiya Janata Party politicians from Bihar
Lok Janshakti Party politicians